Joseph Fernex (died 14 February 1795) was a judge in the Revolutionary Tribunals during the French Revolution.

A silk weaver from Lyon, close to Joseph Chalier, he was one of fived judges appointed in Lyon following the victory of the revolutionary armies.  He later served as a judge in Orange, Vaucluse.

He was killed during the First White Terror in Lyon and his body thrown into the Rhone.

References

1795 deaths
18th-century French judges
Lawyers from Lyon
People of the French Revolution
French weavers